Don Luzzi (August 20, 1935 – October 30, 2005) was a politician and professional football player who played in the Canadian Football League.

CFL career
After playing college football at Villanova University, Don Luzzi played 12 seasons for the Calgary Stampeders from 1958 to 1969. Luzzi was an all-Western conference star, both as an offensive tackle and as a defensive tackle. In 1958, he was selected to the CFL Western All-Star Team at both offensive and defensive tackle positions. He was also an all-Canadian defensive tackle in 1962, 1963, and 1966. His team reached the Grey Cup game once, in 1968, but lost a close game to the Ottawa Rough Riders. Luzzi was elected to the Canadian Football Hall of Fame in 1986.

Political career
Luzzi made a run at provincial politics. He ran for the Alberta Social Credit Party in the 1971 Alberta general election in the riding of Calgary-Buffalo. Luzzi was defeated in a hotly contested election by Ron Ghitter, losing to Ghitter by about 500 votes.

Videos
Hall of Fame member

1935 births
2005 deaths
American players of Canadian football
Calgary Stampeders players
Canadian football defensive linemen
Canadian Football Hall of Fame inductees
Canadian football offensive linemen
Canadian sportsperson-politicians
People from North Branford, Connecticut
Players of American football from Connecticut
Alberta Social Credit Party candidates in Alberta provincial elections
Villanova Wildcats football players